is the Japanese word for the color of dye from the Madder plant, a dark shade of red.

Akaneiro may also refer to:
 Akaneiro ni Somaru Saka, an adult visual novel
 Akaneiro: Demon Hunters, an ARPG videogame